Kasper Stadaas (born 21 February 1994) is a Norwegian cross-country skier.

He competed at the 2013 World Junior Championships, finishing seventh in the sprint race.

He made his World Cup debut in February 2016 in Drammen, a sprint race. Competing in nothing but sprint, he made his breakthrough around New Years' 2018 with a seventh place in Lillehammer and a ninth place in Dresden. He improved his career best to a fifth place in March 2018 in Drammen, and again broke the top 10 in January 2020 Dresden.

He represents the sports club IL Heming.

Cross-country skiing results
All results are sourced from the International Ski Federation (FIS).

World Cup

Season standings

References 

1994 births
Living people
Skiers from Oslo
Norwegian male cross-country skiers